Jeronima or Jerónima is a feminine given name. It may refer to:

In people
 Jerónima de la Asunción (1555-1630), Spanish Catholic nun
 Jerônima Mesquita (1880-1972), Brazilian feminist
 Jerónima Nava y Saavedra (1669-1727), writer and Catholic religious from New Kingdom of Granada (present-day Colombia). 

In other uses
 The Nun Jerónima de la Fuente, portrait painting by Diego Velázquez
 Ang Luha at Lualhati ni Jeronima  (The Sorrow and Happiness of Jeronima), 2018 Philippine short film

See also
 Jeronimas